How to Make Love to a Woman is a 2010 American sex comedy film directed by Scott Culver and written by Dennis Kao, both making their respective debuts, starring Josh Meyers, Krysten Ritter, Eugene Byrd, James Hong, and Ian Somerhalder. It was released in the United States on DVD on July 13, 2010, by E1 Entertainment.

Premise
The film follows Andy (Meyers) and his miscommunications regarding sex.

Cast
 Josh Meyers as Andy
 Krysten Ritter as Lauren
 Eugene Byrd as Layne
 Ian Somerhalder as Daniel
 Jenna Jameson as herself
 Ken Jeong as Curtis Lee
 James Kyson Lee as Aaron
 Raviv Ullman as Scott Conners
 James Hong as Sifu
 Catherine Reitman as Vani
 Peter Jason as Mr. Conners
 Ryan Key as himself
 Chris Violette as Gas Station Attendant

References

External links
 

2010 films
2010 comedy films
2010 directorial debut films
2010 direct-to-video films
2010s sex comedy films
American direct-to-video films
American sex comedy films
Direct-to-video comedy films
Films scored by Nathan Wang
Films shot in Los Angeles
2010s English-language films
2010s American films